Lionel Tiger (born February 5, 1937) is a Canadian-American anthropologist. He is the Charles Darwin Professor of Anthropology at Rutgers University and co-Research Director of the Harry Frank Guggenheim Foundation.

Early life and education 
Born in 1937 in Montreal, Quebec, he is a graduate of McGill University, and the London School of Economics at the University of London, England. He is also a consultant to the U.S. Department of Defense on the future of biotechnology. Lionel Tiger lives in New York City, and regularly contributes to mainstream media such as Psychology Today and The New York Times.

Career 
Lionel Tiger did not start out in the field of biology or anthropology, only taking one class that was required of him. Tiger started his path towards his later career with his study on the decolonization of Africa. While in Ghana and Nigeria on a summer fellowship, he studied Kwame Nkrumah, Ghana's first postcolonial president. Tiger wanted to find out if a theory that Max Weber had about the "routinization of charisma" would be applicable in the political realm of Ghana. While researching, he was inspired by Weber's questions and new discoveries in Africa by Raymond Dart and Lewis Leakey. Along with other studies that were being conducted at the time, including the discovery of DNA and that of research of primates in the wild, Tiger was inspired to do his own research on the human species, mainly that of males and the way they interact with one another. Since he noticed that primates and other animals in the wild created their own social structures between males and females (thanks to research conducted by Jane Goodall, Desmond Morris and Irven DeVore), he wanted to see if there was a biological connection to social constructs. Tiger was fighting against the thought that "only humans displayed ongoing and intelligent agency..." He teamed up with Robin Fox to write Men in Groups (1969) and is credited with coining the term "male-bonding." He argued that the bonds between males were just as important as those between males and females. In his book Men in Groups he introduced his hypothesis that there was an "evolutionary basis of the cross-cultural regularity of male bonds and groups." The book put Dr. Tiger in the headlines, some good and some bad. After writing Men in Groups he went on to continue his research, bringing forward controversial concepts in his book The Imperial Animal and Women in the Kibbutz. One of his latest works, The Decline of Males has also come under fire for his controversial view of birth control for women.

Works 
Some of Tiger's works have included controversial concepts, including biogrammar, the biological origins of social interactions and the limitation of culture strictly by survival necessities, based on the also controversial Noam Chomsky theory of universal grammar. Tiger published a work, The Imperial Animal, with Robin Fox in 1971 that advocated a 'social carnivore theory' of human evolution.

Tiger has predicted the higher status of women within society, in books such as The Decline of Males and Men in Groups. He has also written books such as The Pursuit of Pleasure, which discussed the concept that evolution has established the biological mechanisms of pleasure and that they have survival origins.

Controversy 
Tiger's advocacy for men's rights has led to him being called "the mad scientist of biological reductionism". His books make controversial claims, including that birth control for women has emasculated men and forever changed the family dynamic, that when women use birth control, they are taking power and choice away from the men in their lives, and that women working outside of the home leads to men's earning less and no longer functioning as "effective providers." Tiger has received death threats, bomb threats and threats of physical harm, and his book The Imperial Animal has been compared to Mein Kampf by Maureen Duffy.

Books 

 
 
Tiger, Lionel; Shepher, Joseph (1975). Women in the Kibbutz. Harcourt Brace Jovanovich. .
 
Tiger, Lionel (1987). The Manufacture of Evil: Ethics, Evolution and the Industrial System. Harper Collins. .

References

External links
Rutgers biography

1937 births
Living people
20th-century Canadian non-fiction writers
20th-century Canadian male writers
21st-century Canadian non-fiction writers
20th-century Canadian scientists
21st-century Canadian scientists
Academics from Montreal
Alumni of the London School of Economics
Canadian anthropologists
Canadian expatriate academics in the United Kingdom
Canadian expatriate academics in the United States
McGill University alumni
Scientists from Montreal
Writers from Montreal
Rutgers University faculty
Canadian expatriate writers
21st-century Canadian male writers
Canadian male non-fiction writers